Cooking Fever is a cooking simulation mobile game developed in 2014 by Nordcurrent, a Lithuanian game developing and publishing company. In the game, players manage various restaurants by making foods and drinks, serving customers, and earning money. Players need to make some upgrades of their kitchen appliances and interior features to clear higher levels.

Since its release in 2014, Cooking Fever has become one of the most popular Nordcurrent mobile games, having been cumulatively downloaded almost 400 million times since the release.

In 2015, Nordcurrent developed game Cooking Fever was awarded as the game of the year by LT Game Awards.

In 2016, Cooking Fever had their first collaboration with the FC Barcelona football team. Players had the opportunity to cook for fans and some of the team’s best-known players such as Lionel Messi, Luis Suárez, Neymar, Gerard Piqué and Andrés Iniesta.

In 2017, Cooking Fever had its second collaboration with Hell’s Kitchen. The game required players to master various cooking techniques within the allotted time to become Head Chef of Hell’s Kitchen. Soon after, the restaurant's name was changed to the "Gourmet Restaurant" due to copyright reasons.

On December 1, 2017, Nordcurrent was partnered with Coca-Cola to release an update where players can sell official Coca-Cola beverages in-game. As of December 4, 2018, all references to Coca-Cola were removed.

On December 4, 2019, the customers were all modified with more animated motion in a special 3D design.

Cooking Fever had another collaboration on December 16, 2019 with the Hard Rock Cafe. This partnership gave players worldwide the ability to step inside the kitchen of the virtual Hard Rock Cafe. The name of the restaurant was then changed to the "Rock & Roll Bar" due to copyright reasons.

References

External links 
 

2014 video games
Android (operating system) games
Cooking video games
IOS games
Video games developed in Lithuania
Nordcurrent games